KWU may refer to
Kansas Wesleyan University, United States
Kyoto Women's University, Japan